Wicked Lester was a rock band based in New York City. Two notable members were bassist Gene Klein and rhythm guitarist Stanley Eisen. Originally formed in 1970 as Rainbow, the band changed its name to Wicked Lester in 1971 to avoid confusion with another local band named "Rainbow". Although it secured a record deal with Epic Records and recorded an album, the deal fell through and the band fell apart during 1972. Klein and Eisen, feeling that the band's failure was a result of its lack of vision and direction, decided to found a new band from its remnants. They changed their names to the respective Gene Simmons and Paul Stanley, auditioned a new drummer and lead guitarist, and formed the band Kiss by the end of January 1973.

Although Kiss achieved massive success, Wicked Lester's album recorded for Epic has never been officially released in its entirety. The sessions have been released in bootleg form as The Original Wicked Lester Sessions. Kiss officially released three tracks from these sessions on their 2001 Box Set release. Wicked Lester's music featured elements of rock and roll, folk rock and pop.

History

Rainbow 
The origins of the band trace to 1970, when bassist Gene Klein and keyboardist Brooke Ostrander recruited lead guitarist Stephen Coronel, a childhood friend and former bandmate of Klein. The group took the name Rainbow shortly thereafter. Coronel recommended rhythm guitarist Stanley Eisen, who had actually been rejected by the group after a previous audition. Shortly after Eisen joined, Ostrander recruited drummer Joe Davidson, and the first Rainbow lineup was completed. Davidson's stay did not last long and he was replaced by drummer Tony Zarrella.

In early 1971, Rainbow played its first show, which consisted of two sets performed at Richmond Community College in Staten Island. After the show, the group discovered that there was already another band called Rainbow. They decided to drop the name, and came up with the name Wicked Lester, which Klein liked because it was unusual. While the decision to change the group's name came partly out of a desire to avoid any potential legal issues, it also reflected Klein and Eisen's desire to start playing more original compositions.

Crossroads 
During their brief existence, Wicked Lester performed in public twice. The first show took place at the Rivoli Theatre in South Fallsburg, New York on April 23, 1971. The second, in late summer 1971, was at an Atlantic City, New Jersey hotel hosting a B'nai B'rith Youth Organization event. Not long after that show, the band suffered a major setback when they had all of their musical gear stolen. After a chance meeting with Electric Lady Studios engineer Ron Johnsen, Wicked Lester was given the opportunity to record some demos in late 1971. Johnsen, who produced the demo tape, shopped it to a few labels, with no success. Eventually the tape was screened by Epic Records, who purchased the masters and agreed to fund the recording of a full album. One of the conditions, however, was that Stephen Coronel be fired and replaced with a better guitarist.

Coronel was replaced by session musician Ron Leejack (Ronald Jackowski, ex-Cactus), and the group continued their efforts to finish the album. Some songs were completely re-recorded to accommodate Leejack's different playing style. The entire recording process, which followed a haphazard schedule, took nearly a year to complete. When the completed album was presented to Don Ellis, Epic's A&R director, he stated that he hated the album and was not going to release it. The next day, Wicked Lester manager Lew Linet requested and received the group's release from Epic Records.

Kiss 
At this time, Klein and Eisen, now using the stage names Gene Simmons and Paul Stanley, decided that one of the reasons for Wicked Lester's lack of success was their lack of a singular image and musical vision. They made the decision to move forward and start a new band. Wicked Lester began auditioning for a drummer. Tony Zarrella recorded all the Wicked Lester drum tracks at Electric Lady Studio produced by Ron Johsen.  After completion, Tony Zarrella left the group & afterwards recorded & toured with NYC based groups "Dreams In Color" & "MYTH". Ostrander, feeling that the band was going nowhere, quit. He went on to teach music at Missisquoi Valley Union High School in Swanton, Vermont. Ostrander died on September 3, 2011, from cancer. For a short time, Ron Leejack continued on with the new version of Wicked Lester.

Whereas Wicked Lester's original sound was rooted in varied musical styles, including folk and pop, when Simmons and Stanley decided to recruit new members, they made the decision to focus on a more aggressive and simple style of rock and roll. The first new member they added was drummer Peter Criss, who had placed an ad in Rolling Stone. The ad stated, "EXPD. ROCK & roll drummer looking for orig. grp. doing soft & hard music. Peter, Brooklyn." The new Wicked Lester, without a recording contract, began a strict and regular regimen of rehearsals.

In November 1972, the group arranged a showcase with Don Ellis, the Epic Records executive who earlier had rejected Wicked Lester's album. While one Epic executive, Tom Werman, was impressed by the power and theatrics of this new incarnation of Wicked Lester, Ellis once again turned them down. As Ellis was leaving, Peter Criss's brother, who was drunk, vomited on his foot. In early December, Paul Stanley placed an ad in The Village Voice stating, "LEAD GUITARIST WANTED with Flash and Ability. Album Out Shortly. No time wasters please." The ad ran for two issues, December 7 and 14, 1972, leading to several audition sessions. One audition was by Paul "Ace" Frehley who showed up wearing different-colored shoes, walked into the room without saying a word, hooked up his guitar and started playing. Frehley was asked back for a second audition and was a member of the band by Christmas 1972. Within a few weeks, the group changed its name to Kiss and played their first concert on January 30, 1973.

Unreleased album 

The recording of Wicked Lester's album, which began in November 1971 at Electric Lady Studios in Greenwich Village, took place over multiple sessions and was finished in July 1972. The album was a mixture of original material and covers, showcasing the group's eclectic style. Three of the songs recorded for the Wicked Lester album would later resurface as Kiss songs, with varying degrees of similarity.

The chorus of their cover version of The Hollies' "I Wanna Shout" would serve as the inspiration for "Shout It Out Loud" from 1976's Destroyer, although the two songs otherwise bear little similarity. Two of the tracks, "Love Her All I Can", written by Paul Stanley, and "She", written by Simmons and Steve Coronel would resurface on 1975's Dressed to Kill. "Love Her All I Can" featured similar arrangements in both versions while the Kiss version of "She" lacked the congas and flute of the original.

The only part of Wicked Lester's album to initially be released was the cover art, which was used for The Laughing Dogs' self-titled debut album in 1979. CBS Records, who owned the rights to the album, remixed it and planned to release it in late 1976 to capitalize on Kiss's popularity at the time. Kiss and Neil Bogart, the president of their label, Casablanca Records, purchased the master tapes from CBS for $137,500 and never released it. The label and band feared that if CBS released the tracks it would diminish their commercial appeal. The band worried that their hard rock image would be damaged by these more eclectic recordings. It was also feared that the release would be accompanied by pictures of Simmons and Stanley without their trademark makeup; Kiss had yet to officially unmask themselves at the time. In later years the album surfaced as a bootleg titled  The Original Wicked Lester Sessions. The band bought Bogart's share and eventually released three of the tracks, "Keep Me Waiting," "She," and "Love Her All I Can", in 2001 as part of a five-disc box set.

Track listing 
 "Love Her All I Can" 	(2:28) Stanley
 "Sweet Ophelia" 	(2:56) Barry Mann/Gerry Goffin
 "Keep Me Waiting" 	(3:04) Stanley
 "Simple Type" 	(2:33) Simmons
 "She" 	(2:54) Coronel/Simmons
 "Too Many Mondays" 	(3:27) Barry Mann/Cynthia Weil
 "What Happens in the Darkness" 	(2:59) Tamy Lester Smith
 "When the Bell Rings" 	(3:11) Austin Roberts/Christopher Welch
 "Molly" (aka "Some Other Guy") 	(2:23) Stanley
 "We Want to Shout It Out Loud" 	(2:04) The Hollies

The band also recorded a song called "Long, Long Road" that might have made it onto the album.

Members 
 Paul Stanley – rhythm guitar, vocals 
 Gene Simmons – bass, vocals 
 Brooke Ostrander – keyboards 
 Stephen Coronel – lead guitar 
 Joe Davidson – drums 
 Tony Zarrella – drums & percussion 
 Ron Leejack – lead guitar 
 Peter Criss – drums

Timeline

See also 
Chelsea, another pre-Kiss band, featuring Kiss drummer Peter Criss

Notes

References 

Rock music groups from New York (state)
American folk rock groups
Musical groups established in 1970
Musical groups disestablished in 1973
Kiss (band)
Musical groups from New York City
Epic Records artists